{{safesubst:#invoke:RfD|||month = March
|day = 17
|year = 2023
|time = 12:43
|timestamp = 20230317124300

|content=
REDIRECT List of Chinese films of 2020

}}